The Embassy of the Federal Republic of Germany in Lima is the official diplomatic mission of Germany to the Republic of Peru.

History

19th century
As a result of the establishment of consular relations between Peru and the then German Confederation, a Hamburger consulate was opened in Peru in 1828, with other German states opening consulates after, such as Lübeck, Hannover and Bremen. The Prussian headed German Customs Union was established in 1834, with which Peru maintained its commercial relations and was also the signatory of the first diplomatic treaty between both entities in the Prussian consulate in 1860, which was left without effect.

As Germany territorially evolved, Peru maintained relations with its predecessors, such as the North German Confederation, to whom Peru expressed its neutrality during the Franco-Prussian War and whose first envoy presented his credentials on July 5, 1870, until the establishment of the German Empire in 1871. At the time, the Peruvian ambassador to Russia was accredited to Germany from its legation in Saint Petersburg, then changing to that also accredited to Austria-Hungary.

During the War of the Pacific, the German consulates in Lima protested against the excesses committed by the Chilean Army during their land campaign in the south and the occupation of Lima against the German colony in Peru. To prevent such events, foreign consulates had distributed their countries' flags and national symbols to used by foreign residents in their homes, which was not respected. As a result, many foreigners fled to Lima, where houses were rented, serving as the residences of specific colonies under the protection of their respective legations. The German legation remained open for the duration of the conflict, abstaining from recognizing the Magdalena government, only recognizing the government of Miguel Iglesias on April 14, 1884.

20th century
Relations between Peru and Germany remained stable until World War I. The now poor relations culminated in the Peruvian government severing its relations with both Germany and Austria-Hungary in 1917. As a result, the countries' legations closed, with the Spanish Embassy now in charge of protecting German interests in Peru. Relations were reestablished with the Weimar Republic on May 28, 1920.

As a result of German declaration of war against the United States, Peru severed its relations with Germany on January 24, 1942, notifying then German ambassador  via a letter. On the same day, Noebel requested his safe passage out of the country, notifying the Peruvian government that the Spanish Embassy would again be in charge of protecting German interests in Peru.

After the Second World War, relations were reestablished on January 31, 1951, with the Federal Republic of Germany, who opened a consulate in Lima on September 4, 1952, that was elevated to embassy level in 1953.

After the 1968 Peruvian coup d'état and the establishment of Juan Velasco Alvarado's Revolutionary Government, relations with the German Democratic Republic were also established on December 28, 1972. A diplomatic mission, located in Salaverry Avenue, was opened in Lima, also accredited to Bolivia. It closed after German reunification in 1990.

During the internal conflict in Peru, like other embassies, the German embassy was targeted at least twice, as an attempt was made on a Civil Guard that was guarding it on September 16, 1984; and the embassy was affected by a series of embassy bombings that took place on February 21, 1986, and also targeted the Chinese, Spain, Romanian, Japan, Chilean and Argentine embassies. The German ambassador's residence was also targeted in an unsuccessful arson attack on September 2, 1983.

The ambassador's residence was completely renovated in 2003 and 2004 at a total cost of € 450,000. The embassy moved from Arequipa Avenue to the Alto Caral building in November 2013.

Mission and organization
The Embassy has the task of maintaining German-Peruvian relations, representing German interests to the government of Peru and informing the federal government about developments in Peru.

The Embassy has the following areas of work:
Politics department (foreign and domestic policy)
Economics department (economic policy, foreign trade promotion)
Department of Culture (education, art and science)
Military Attaché Staff (Head: Frigate Commander)
Development Cooperation Department (Focus on state modernization, sustainable urban development, protection and sustainable use of natural resources and climate change; Peru has been supported with around two billion euros since the beginning of the bilateral cooperation.)

The embassy's legal and consular department offers German citizens consular services and assistance in emergencies. The Embassy's consular district covers all of Peru. The visa office issues entry permits for citizens of third countries residing in Peru who are subject to the visa requirement. Peruvian citizens do not need a visa for stays in the Schengen area (up to 90 days per half year).

Honorary consuls of the Federal Republic of Germany are appointed and resident in Arequipa, Iquitos, Cuzco, Piura and Trujillo.

See also
List of ambassadors of Germany to Peru
Embassy of the United States, Lima
Embassy of Russia, Lima

References

Bibliography

Germany
Peru
Germany–Peru relations